Territorial Assembly elections were held in Gabon in March 1952. The result was a victory for the Gabonese Democratic and Social Union, which won 14 of the 24 contested seats.

Results

References

Gabon
1952 in Gabon
Elections in Gabon
Election and referendum articles with incomplete results
March 1952 events in Africa